Vagner or Vágner is both a masculine given name and a surname. It is a version of the Germanic surname Wagner. Notable people with the name include:

Surname
Alexandru Vagner (born 1989), Romanian footballer
Ivan Vagner (born 1985), Russian engineer and cosmonaut 
Jakub Vágner (born 1981), Czech television presenter and angler
László Vágner (born 1955), Hungarian football referee
Martin Vagner (born 1984), Czech ice hockey player
Robert Vágner (born 1974), Czech footballer
Yana Vagner (born 1973), Russian writer and journalist

Given name

Vágner Benazzi (born 1954), Brazilian footballer and manager
Vágner Mancini (born 1966), Brazilian footballer and manager
Vágner (footballer, born 1973), full name Vágner Rogério Nunes, Brazilian football midfielder
Vagner (footballer, born 1978), full name Vagner da Silva Sarti, Brazilian football midfielder
Vagner Luís (born 1980), Brazilian footballer
Vágner Kaetano Pereira (born 1980), Russian futsal player
Vagner Rocha (born 1982), Brazilian mixed martial artist
Vágner (footballer, born 1983), full name Rafael Vágner Dias Silva, Brazilian football centre-back
Vágner Love (born 1984), Brazilian footballer
Vagner (footballer, born 1986), full name Vagner da Silva, Brazilian football goalkeeper
Vagner (footballer, born 1987), full name Vagner Pereira Costa, Brazilian football midfielder
Vagner (footballer, born 1989), full name Vagner Antônio Brandalise, Brazilian football goalkeeper

See also
Wagner (surname)

Masculine given names